The light heavyweight division in mixed martial arts contains different weight classes.

It sits between the lighter middleweight division, and the heavyweight division.

Professional champions

Current champions 
These tables last updated in June 2022.
 Active title reign

See also
List of current MMA Light Heavyweight champions
List of UFC Light Heavyweight Champions
List of Strikeforce Light Heavyweight Champions
List of Pancrase Light Heavyweight Champions

References

Mixed martial arts weight classes